Deanne Bergsma (born 16 April 1941) is a South African ballerina, who made her career in the Royal Ballet at Covent Garden. She was born in 1941 and showed early promise as a dancer, She first came to London in 1957 to take up a place in the Royal Ballet School, having been talent-spotted by Claude Newman, former principal dancer and ballet-master of the Vic-Wells Ballet and now a visiting examiner of the Royal Academy of Dance. In two years she had graduated from the school and joined the Royal Ballet company in 1957. She climbed rapidly through the ranks to become a principal ballerina and appeared in a wide array of roles, both classical and contemporary, until her retirement in 1975. This eighteen-year career coincided with an exciting period for the Royal Ballet. Apart from the stream of new works from Ashton and Macmillan the company's resident director-choreographers, it was the heyday of the partnership of Margot Fonteyn and Rudolf Nureyev. The company was touring worldwide and was rarely out of the headlines.

Early life
Born in Harrismith in 1941 in the Orange Free State. The daughter of a doctor and one of four children. In 1946 the family moved to Pretoria. By a happy chance the new family home had an adjoining studio which was used for dancing classes. Thus at an early age Deanne was introduced to ballet. Her development was supervised by one South Africa's most formidable dance teachers, Marjory Sturman. Deanne regularly took part in eisteddfods and school productions of the classics and was encouraged to take an RAD examinations. Hence she came to the notice of Claude Newman, as mentioned above, and made her way to London and the Royal Ballet School.

Career
A tall and elegant dancer Deanne Bergsma's earliest opportunities to shine were in the classical repertoire, notably as Odette/Odile in Swan Lake, as the Lilac Fairy in Sleeping Beauty and as Myrtha, Queen of the Wilis, in Giselle. She was partnered variously by Donald MacLeary, Keith Rosson, Desmond Kelly and Rudolf Nureyev. She also made her mark in many ballets of Ashton and Balanchine (famously an adherent of tall ballerinas). She had the benefit of personal coaching from Balanchine himself and from Bronislava Nijinska for the role of the Hostess in one of her best-known ballets, Les Biches. A totally new dimension was added to Bergsma's repertory and reputation in 1970, when the American choreographer Glen Tetley chose her and Desmond Kelly to create the leading roles in his new ballet Field Figures. Two years later Rudolf Nureyev and Bergsma danced together in filmed excerpts of this ballet. (See Films below).

She retired from the company in 1974, although she returned in 1988 to take the role of Berta in a revival of Ashton's Ondine.

Bergsma served on the judging panel for the Young British Dancer of the Year competition in 2011, and as a judge in the semi-finals of the Genée International Ballet Competition in 2010.

Roles 

*Lord of Burleigh is usually performed to an orchestrated version of Mendelssohns' Songs Without Words. But at a gala performance in the Maltings in 1970 Benjamin Britten accompanied Deanne Bergsma on stage at the piano.

Operas 
In the later years of her career at Covent Garden Bergsma made appearances in non-singing roles in opera productions. Benjamin Britten asked her to create the role of the Polish Mother in what was be his last opera Death in Venice. This production, directed by Colin Graham, with set designs by John Piper, costumes by Charles Knode and choreography by Frederick Ashton, was premiered at the Maltings in Snape in 1973 and later performed at Covent Garden, at the Fenice Theatre in Venice and at the Theatre de la Monnaie in Brussels. At Covent Garden she also appeared in John Schlesinger's production of Offenbach's The Tales of Hoffmann in the non-singing role of Stella. In Anthony Besch's production of Mozart's La Clemenza di Tito she made a mime appearance as Titus's inamorata Berenice.

Film

Post Retirement 
After retiring in 1975 at Anthony Dowell's invitation she returned to Covent Garden as a guest artist in revivals of Ondine, The Firebird and as the Queen Mother in Dowell's production of Swan Lake. She also coached younger dancers in several of her former roles. She served for eight years as a member of the Royal Ballet's Board of Governors, which has oversight of the Royal Ballet companies in London and Birmingham and of both the junior and senior Royal Ballet schools. Until 2020 she served as a leading external examiner for the Royal Ballet schools.

Personal life 
In 1968 she married Keith Grant, then General Manager of both the Royal Opera Company and the Benjamin Britten's English Opera Group. They have a son and a daughter.

References

External links

Audio interview with Deanne Bergsma, conducted in 1972 by John Gruen

South African ballerinas
1941 births
Living people
Principal dancers of The Royal Ballet
People from Pretoria